The 2016–17 St. John's Red Storm men's basketball team represented St. John's University during the 2016–17 NCAA Division I men's basketball season. They were coached by alumni and Naismith Memorial Basketball Hall of Fame member Chris Mullin in his second year at the school. They played their home games at Carnesecca Arena and Madison Square Garden as members of the Big East Conference. They finished the regular season 14–19, 7–11 in Big East play to finish in eighth place. They defeated Georgetown in the first round of the Big East tournament before losing to Villanova in the quarterfinals.

Previous season
The Red Storm finished the 2015–16 season with a record of 8–24, 1–17 in Big East play to finish in last place in conference. They lost to Marquette in the first round of the Big East tournament.

Preseason
Prior to the season, St. John's was picked to finish in eighth place in a poll of Big East coaches. Shamorie Ponds was named the preseason Rookie of the Year.

Offseason

Departures

2016 recruiting class

Transfer additions

2017 Recruiting class

Roster

Schedule and results

|-
!colspan=9 style=| Exhibition

|-
!colspan=9 style=| Non-conference regular season

|-
!colspan=9 style=""|Big East regular season

|-
!colspan=9 style=|Big East tournament

References

St. John's Red Storm men's basketball seasons
St. John's
Saint John's
Saint John's